Puerto Rico Senatorial District VII, also known as the Senatorial District of Humacao, is one of the eight senatorial districts of Puerto Rico. It is currently represented by José Luis Dalmau and Miguel Laureano (from the Popular Democratic Party and New Progressive Party respectively).

District profile

The Senatorial District VII has an approximate population of 462,914. It covers the following municipalities:
 Caguas
 Gurabo
 Humacao
 Juncos
 Las Piedras
 Maunabo
 Naguabo
 Patillas
 San Lorenzo
 Yabucoa

In previous distributions, the territory covered by the Senatorial District VII has changed. In 1972, the District included the municipalities of Río Grande, Luquillo, Fajardo, and Ceiba. However, it didn't include Arroyo, Maunabo, or Patillas. In 1983, Aguas Buenas, Arroyo, Maunabo, and Patillas were reassigned to the District, while Río Grande, Luquillo, and Fajardo were reassigned to the District of Carolina. In the 1991 redistribution, Ceiba was assigned to the District of Carolina.

In the 2002 redistribution, Arroyo was assigned to the District of Guayama, and in the 2011 redistribution, Aguas Buenas was reassigned to the District of San Juan.

Election results

2012

|-
! style="background-color:#FF0000" |
| style="width: 130px" | Popular Democratic Party (PPD)
|               | José Luis Dalmau
| 117,610
| 26.37
| +2.65
|-
! style="background-color:#FF0000" |
| style="width: 130px" | Popular Democratic Party (PPD)
|               | Jorge Suárez
| 114,165
| 25.60
| +2.88
|-
! style="background-color:#0080FF" |
| style="width: 130px" | New Progressive Party (PNP)
|               | José Ramón Díaz
| 98,361
| 22.06
| -2.02
|-
! style="background-color:#0080FF" |
| style="width: 130px" | New Progressive Party (PNP)
|               | Luz M. Santiago
| 97,800
| 21.93
| -2.14
|-
! style="background-color:#01DF3A" |
| style="width: 130px" | Puerto Rican Independence Party (PIP)
|               | Maritza Algarín Sepúlveda
| 5,552
| 1.24
| 
|-
! style="background-color:#01DF3A" |
| style="width: 130px" | Puerto Rican Independence Party (PIP)
|               | Juan "Cholo" Lebrón
| 5,081
| 1.14
| +0.18
|-
! style="background-color:#008080" |
| style="width: 130px" | Movimiento Unión Soberanista (MUS)
|               | Vilma Calderón Jiménez
| 2,417
| 0.54
| 
|-
! style="background-color:#800080" |
| style="width: 130px" | Worker's People Party of Puerto Rico (PPT)
|               | Carlos R. Mercado Cotto
| 1,378
| 0.31
| 
|-
! style="background-color:#FFBF00" |
| style="width: 130px" | Puerto Ricans for Puerto Rico Party (PPR)
|               | José Luis "Tito" Dones
| 797
| 0.18
|

2008

|-
! style="background-color:#0080FF" |
| style="width: 130px" | New Progressive Party (PNP)
|               | José Ramón Díaz
| 117,408
| 24.08%
| 
|-
! style="background-color:#0080FF" |
| style="width: 130px" | New Progressive Party (PNP)
|               | Luz M. Santiago
| 117,341
| 24.07
| 
|-
! style="background-color:#FF0000" |
| style="width: 130px" | Popular Democratic Party (PPD)
|               | José Luis Dalmau
| 115,612
| 23.72
| -0.30
|-
! style="background-color:#FF0000" |
| style="width: 130px" | Popular Democratic Party (PPD)
|               | Jorge Suárez
| 110,777
| 22.72
| 
|-
! style="background-color:#FFBF00" |
| style="width: 130px" | Puerto Ricans for Puerto Rico Party (PPR)
|               | Sylvia Roldán Cruz
| 7,227
| 1.48
| 
|-
! style="background-color:#FFBF00" |
| style="width: 130px" | Puerto Ricans for Puerto Rico Party (PPR)
|               | Angel Nieves Rivera
| 6,740
| 1.38
| 
|-
! style="background-color:#01DF3A" |
| style="width: 130px" | Puerto Rican Independence Party (PIP)
|               | Felícita Cotto Ortíz
| 4,865
| 1.00
| 
|-
! style="background-color:#01DF3A" |
| style="width: 130px" | Puerto Rican Independence Party (PIP)
|               | Juan Lebrón López
| 4,678
| 0.96
|

2004

|-
! style="background-color:#FF0000" |
| style="width: 130px" | Popular Democratic Party (PPD)
|               | José Luis Dalmau
| 119,859
| 24.38%
| +0.18
|-
! style="background-color:#FF0000" |
| style="width: 130px" | Popular Democratic Party (PPD)
|               | Sixto Hernández Serrano
| 118,329
| 24.07
| +0.07
|-
! style="background-color:#0080FF" |
| style="width: 130px" | New Progressive Party (PNP)
|               | Pickie Díaz
| 115,829
| 23.56
| 
|-
! style="background-color:#0080FF" |
| style="width: 130px" | New Progressive Party (PNP)
|               | Rafy Uceta
| 114,679
| 23.33
| 
|-
! style="background-color:#01DF3A" |
| style="width: 130px" | Puerto Rican Independence Party (PIP)
|               | Raúl Tirado
| 10,413
| 2.12
| 
|-
! style="background-color:#01DF3A" |
| style="width: 130px" | Puerto Rican Independence Party (PIP)
|               | Víctor Torres Ortíz
| 10,021
| 2.04
| -0.66

References

External links
Distribución de Distritos Senatoriales de Puerto Rico

Puerto Rico Senatorial districts